This list is about Israeli footballers that play in international clubs.

Players

For the current national team squad, see Israel national football team#Current squad.

External links 
 National Team at the Israel Football Association website

International
Association football player non-biographical articles